Gypsy Sport is an American fashion brand.

The company is based in New York City and the creative director is Rio Uribe. Uribe grew up in Koreatown, Los Angeles. After working for Balenciaga, rising to head of merchandising, he founded Gypsy Sport in 2012.

The company's models include Shamir Bailey, Maya Mones, Munroe Bergdorf, Emilia Ortiz, Desmond Napoles, and Lourdes Leon. Fans of the brand include Jaden Smith, A$AP Ferg and John Cale.

All of their products are made in the US: New York City, Philadelphia, and Los Angeles.

In June 2020, in honor of the 50th anniversary of the first LGBTQ Pride parade, Queerty named Uribe among the fifty heroes “leading the nation toward equality, acceptance, and dignity for all people”.

References

External links

2010s fashion
Clothing brands of the United States
Companies based in New York City
Manufacturing companies based in New York City